Harri Tiido (born 8 October 1953 in Jõhvi) is an Estonian diplomat.

He graduated from University of Tartu in Romance-Germanic philology. Since 1980 he has worked as a journalist at Estonian Radio and Kuku Radio. 1996-1997 he worked for the radio Voice of America. 1997-2000 he was chief editor of Kuku Radio.

Since 2000 he has been working for Estonian Foreign Ministry. 2008-2012 he was non-resident Ambassador of Estonia to Afghanistan. Later he was Ambassador of Estonia to Poland. Since 2018 he has been Ambassador of Estonia to Finland.

Awards
 2004: Order of the White Star, III class.

References

Living people
1953 births
Estonian journalists
Estonian diplomats
Ambassadors of Estonia to Afghanistan
Ambassadors of Estonia to Poland
Ambassadors of Estonia to Finland
Recipients of the Order of the White Star, 3rd Class
University of Tartu alumni
People from Jõhvi